Steven G. Kaplan (born February 23, 1962) is an American film and television producer, the co-founder of the film production company Rainstorm Entertainment.

Career
Kaplan co-founded Rainstorm Entertainment along with Gregg Daniel. Rainstorm Entertainment was confirmed in November 2003 to produce and finance the documentary film Fuck, with production scheduled to begin in January 2004. The film was completed in 2005 by film director Steve Anderson's film company Mudflap Films; it was executive produced by Steven Kaplan and Gregg Daniel, along with Bruce Leiserowitz, Jory Weitz and Richard Ardi.

Filmography

Arrest 
On March 31, 2017, Kaplan allegedly threatened to kill another tenant in the pool area of a Hollywood apartment building, pointing what appeared to be a rifle and threatening pedestrians on the street below. Police took him into custody the next day, after a six-hour standoff. His weapon was determined to be a pellet rifle.  In November 2018, Kaplan pleaded no contest to two felony counts of criminal threats. Under the plea deal, he received a suspended prison sentence of three years, four years probation, and was required to undergo drug testing and attend anger management classes.

References

External links 

1962 births
Living people
American film producers
Television producers from California